The Jardin Exotique de Monaco (French for "exotic garden of Monaco") is a botanical garden located on a cliffside in Monaco.

History
The succulent plants were brought back from Mexico in the late 1860s. By 1895, Augustin Gastaud, who served as the Chief Gardener of the State Gardens of Monaco, grew the succulents in the Jardin St Martin.

Albert I, Prince of Monaco acquired a piece of land in Les Moneghetti in 1912. He commissioned Louis Notari, the Chief Engineer of Monaco, to build a new garden with footbridges. During the construction, Notari found a grotto underneath in 1916. Meanwhile, the garden was finished in 1933. Monegasque agronomist Louis Vatrican served as its first director from 1933 to 1969. He added African succulents to the existing South American plants. After he retired in 1969, he was succeeded by Marcel Kroenlein.

The grotto was opened to the public in 1950, but it may only be visited with specialized guides. Evidence of prehistoric human inhabitants has been found in the cave. There is a museum of Prehistoric Anthropology within the Exotic Garden displaying many of those prehistoric remains. It was founded by Prince Albert I in 1902.

References

External links

Jardin Exotique website
The Unofficial Guide to the Jardin Exotique with Photo Album

Botanical gardens in Monaco
Protected areas established in 1933
Cactus gardens